Sire Mandir (हिंदी: सिरे मंदिर) is a Hindu temple dedicated to god shiva (as a form of Jaliendra Nath). Located on the Kalashacal hills near Jalore fort, Jalore is located in the state of Rajasthan, India. The worship place is situated at the height of 646 meter of Kalashacal hills.

Being the sacred groove of sage Jabali many saints came and meditated here. Pandavas spent some of their time here and king Bhruthhari's path leader Suanath and his disciples made it their home. There are many temples for Shiva & Shakti present here, out of which Sire Mandir Temple is famous for its natural environment, belief and austerity.

West of Jalore on Kalashachal Sire temple is situated on 646 m high.  The road in front of Hotel Geetco leads directly towards the Kalashachal mountain.  It is only 3 km. away from town.  While climbing the mountain, we may find Yogiraj Jalandhar Nath Ji's footsteps’ imprints. Nearby there is a temple and one big water hut and a parking place for vehicles.

From valley of mountain to temple it is only  of climbing where stairs are made for safe climbing. In between there is a temple of Hanuman and lord Ganesha built.

Sire temple is the house of lord Shankar built by Raja Ratan Singh known as Ratneshwar Temple and is known for its vastness. Shivling is established in one rounded cave.

Here there is one Jhalara, a big Mansarovar, non Stop ‘Dhunna’, Dining Hall, Palace of Raja Mansingh, two gardens and Resting place on different locations.

Presently in the undertaking of Mahant Shri 1008 Ganganath Ji Maharaj new construction had taken place and plantation on mass basis happened.  There is facility of both telephone and electricity. On the other side water facility for tourists is available 24 hours.

In front of Ratneshwar temple one big elephant of cement & stone is built. Being the sacred grove of Yogi Jalandhar Nath Ji, it also a sacred grove of Yogi Suanath, Dev Nath, Bhawani Nath, Bhairunath, Phoolnath Kesarnath and Bholenath also. Jodhpur's king Mansingh also prayed here to get his kingdom back.

References 

 Sire Temple of Jalore
 Sunda Mata
 https://hotelgeetco.com

Tourist attractions in Jalore district
Hindu temples in Rajasthan
Temples of Jalore District